A special election was held in  on October 8, 1805, to fill a vacancy left by the resignation of John B. Lucas (DR) before the first session of the 9th Congress to take a position as district judge for the District of Louisiana.

Election results

Smith took his seat December 2, 1805

See also
 List of special elections to the United States House of Representatives

References

Pennsylvania 1805 11
Pennsylvania 1805 11
1805 11
Pennsylvania 11
United States House of Representatives 11
United States House of Representatives 1805 11